The South African Military Health Service is the branch of the South African National Defence Force responsible for medical facilities and the training and deployment of all medical personnel within the force. Though unusual, as most national militaries integrate their medical structures into their existing service branches, the SANDF regards this structure as being the most efficient method of providing care and support to the SANDF's personnel.

It is a significant actor in the effort to control HIV/AIDS within the SANDF.

History
The predecessor of the SAMHS, the South African Medical Service, was established as a full service branch of the South African Defence Force (SADF) on 1 July 1979 in order to consolidate and strengthen the medical services of the South African Army, South African Navy and South African Air Force.

Rationalisation
Following the end of the Border War, in the early 1990s, it implemented several retrenchment measures. It consolidated all quartermaster stores in the Cape Town and Bloemfontein areas, relocated its training center from Potchefstroom to Pretoria, closed several medical supply depots, consolidated computer centers and systems, rationalized procedures for procuring medicine and medical equipment, discontinued survival training, and reduced or closed sickbays and military medical clinics that served other armed services affected by retrenchments.

The SAMS was incorporated into the South African National Defence Force on 27 April 1994, and was renamed the South African Military Health Service on 1 June 1998.

Organisational structure
The SAMHS includes active duty military personnel and civilian employees of the Department of Defence. In addition, the service employs roughly 400 medical doctors and private medical specialists are sometimes appointed to supplement the staff of the SAMHS.

The Surgeon General heads the SAMHS and has the rank of Lieutenant-General. The SAMHS operates three Military Hospitals; one in Pretoria, one in Cape Town and one in Bloemfontein. There are also four specialized institutes - the Institute for Aviation Medicine, the Institute for Maritime Medicine, the Military Veterinary Institute and the Military Psychological Institute. Together, these units provide comprehensive medical care for military personnel and their dependents, as well as the police and employees of other security-related government departments, and occasionally to neighboring countries. The SAMHS also provides extensive veterinary services for animals (mainly horses and dogs) used by the security and correctional services. The Institute for Aviation Medicine and the Institute for Maritime Medicine screen pilot candidates for the air force and for civilian aviation certification, as well as divers and submariners for the navy. The military's medical services also include general medical and dental care, and specialized rehabilitation services.

The SAMHS is organized into regional medical commands, corresponding to the army's regional commands, as well as a Medical Logistics Command and a Medical Training Command. The regional commands support military units, military base hospitals, and military unit sickbays in their region. The Medical Logistics Command is responsible for medical logistics only, as each service provides for its own logistics support. In addition, the Medical Training Command supervises the South African Medical Service College, the South African Military Health Service Nursing College, and the South African Military Health Service Training Centre, as well as the military hospitals' training programs. The nursing college, in Pretoria, grants a four-year nursing diploma in association with the University of South Africa. Specialized, in-service training courses for nurses and for nursing assistants are also available.

Formations

Mobile Military Health Formation
1 Medical Battalion Group (Reserve)
3 Medical Battalion Group (Reserve)
6 Medical Battalion Group (Reserve)
7 Medical Battalion Group
8 Medical Battalion Group

Tertiary Military Health Formation

1 Military Hospital (Pretoria)
2 Military Hospital (Cape Town)
3 Military Hospital (Bloemfontein)
Institute for Aviation Medicine (Centurion)
Institute for Maritime Medicine (Simon's Town)
Military Psychological Institute (Pretoria , Area Military Health Unit)
Military Veterinary Institute (Potchefstroom)
Military Cyber Medicine & Cyber Surgery Institute (Pretoria)

Area Military Health Formation
Area Military Health Unit Western Cape
Area Military Health Unit Eastern Cape
Area Military Health Unit Northern Cape
Area Military Health Unit North-West
Area Military Health Unit Free State
Area Military Health Unit KwaZulu-Natal
Area Military Health Unit Gauteng
Area Military Health Unit Mpumalanga
Area Military Health Unit Limpopo
Regional Occupational Health and Safety Centres

Military Health Training Formation
School for Military Health Training
School for Military Training
SAMHS Nursing College
SAMHS Band
Medical Command Post Combat Training Centre (Lohatla)
Joint Physical Training, Sports & Recreation Training Centre

Military Health Support Formation
Military Health Base Depot
Military Health Procurement Unit

General Support Base
Thaba Tshwane

Directorates & Services
Director Medicine
Chaplain Services
Sport & Recreation
Corporate Communication

Ranks and insignia
Officers

Other

Proficiency Insignia

Leadership

References

Military of South Africa
Military medical organizations
Military units and formations established in 1979